The 2015 Challenge Cup, (also known as the Ladbrokes Challenge Cup for sponsorship reasons) was the 114th staging of the rugby league tournament for teams in the Super League, the British National Leagues and a number of invited amateur clubs.

The defending champions Leeds Rhinos retained the trophy beating Hull Kingston Rovers 50-0 at Wembley Stadium on 29 August 2015.

First round
The draw for the first round of the 2015 Challenge Cup was held on 8 January 2015 at Wembley Stadium and featured 40 amateur teams from around the United Kingdom including two student teams, all three armed services and the police.  Home teams were drawn by Martin Offiah and the away teams drawn by Brian Noble.

Fixtures for the first round were mostly played over the weekend of the 31 January – 1 February 2015.  Three fixtures were postponed until the following weekend due to bad weather forcing the postponement on the original date.

Second round
The draw for the second round was made on Monday 2 February at the Oulton Raiders club.  The draw was made by two players who played in the 2014 final. Home teams were drawn by players Ryan Hall of Leeds Rhinos and away teams by Oliver Holmes of Castleford Tigers.

Following the conclusion of the first round ties; two clubs, Rochdale Mayfield and Hull Dockers, were reported to the Rugby Football League's Operational Rules Tribunal for each fielding an ineligible player.  The Tribunal found both clubs guilty of the offence and disqualified them from the competition.  The teams they defeated in the first round, Great Britain Police and Leigh Miners Rangers, were reinstated into the cup and played in the second round.

Third round
The draw for the third round was made on 17 February 2015 at Heritage Quay, University of Huddersfield.  Round three saw the 14 Kingstone Press League 1 professional teams joining the competition to create a pool of 24 teams for the draw.  The draw was made by previous Lance Todd Trophy winners Alex Murphy and Mal Reilly.  Ties were played over the weekend of 7/8 March 2015.

Fourth round
The draw for the fourth round was made on 10 March 2015 at the Provident Stadium, home of the Bradford Bulls.  The draw was made by Leeds Rhinos' Jamie Peacock and Hull FC's Leon Pryce. The 12 winners of the third round ties were joined by the 12 Kingstone Press Championship teams. Ties were played over the weekend of 21/22 March 2015.

Fifth round
The draw for the fifth round was made on Tuesday 24 March 2015 in Hull. The four clubs who finished the 2014 Super League season in 9th to 12th places; Hull Kingston Rovers, Salford Red Devils, Hull F.C. and Wakefield Trinity Wildcats respectively; joined the 12 winners from the fourth round in the draw. The draw was made by ex-players Johnny Whiteley (home teams) and Phil Lowe (away teams). Ties were played over the weekend 17–19 April.

Sixth round
The draw for the sixth round took place live on Sportsday on the BBC News channel on 20 April. The eight winners from this weekend’s fifth round ties joined with the top eight First Utility Super League teams from 2014 in the draw to produce eight ties that will be played over the weekend of May 16–17.  Home teams were drawn by Shaun Edwards and the away teams by Nathan McAvoy.

Quarter-finals
The draw for the quarter finals was made live on BBC Two on 17 May after the Wakefield Trinity Wildcats v Leigh Centurions game. The four ties that will be played over 25–28 June. The draw was conducted by former players Neil Fox (Wakefield Trinity) and Tony Barrow (Leigh). Barrow drew the home teams and Fox, the away teams.

Semi-finals
The draw for the semi finals was made live on BBC Two on 28 June after the St. Helens v Widnes Vikings game. The two ties were played on 31 July and 1 August. The draw was conducted by former Great Britain and St Helens player Paul Sculthorpe  and former footballer turned television presenter Chris Kamara.

Final

The final was played at Wembley Stadium on 29 August 2015, between the 1980 winners Hull Kingston Rovers, in their first final since 1986, and the 12 time winners and holders, the Leeds Rhinos.

Leeds' victory set a new record for the largest winning margin.  The Lance Todd Trophy winner was the Leeds' Tom Briscoe who scored five tries - the first player to achieve this feat at Wembley.

Teams:

Hull Kingston Rovers: Kieran Dixon, Josh Mantellato, Kris Welham, Liam Salter, Ken Sio, Maurice Blair, Albert Kelly, Adam Walker, Shaun Lunt, Tony Puletua, Kevin Larroyer, Graeme Horne, Tyrone McCarthy (captain). Substitutes: John Boudebza, James Donaldson, Dane Tilse, Mitch Allgood.

Leeds Rhinos: Zak Hardaker, Tom Briscoe, Kallum Watkins, Joel Moon, Ryan Hall, Kevin Sinfield (captain), Danny McGuire, Mitch Garbutt, Adam Cuthbertson, Jamie Peacock, Stevie Ward, Carl Ablett, Brett Delaney. Substitutes: Rob Burrow, Kylie Leuluai, Mitch Achurch, Brad Singleton.
Tries: Delaney (1), McGuire (1), Briscoe (5), Singleton (1), Burrow (1). Goals: Sinfield (7/9)

UK broadcasting rights
The tournament was jointly televised by the BBC and Sky Sports on the fourth of their five-year contracts. This time, the BBC televised two sixth round match while Sky Sports televised a fifth round match and a sixth round match. Both channels televised two quarter-final matches with the BBC televising the semi finals and the final.

 Except Northern Ireland.

Sky Sports televised live the fifth round match between Leigh Centurions and Salford Red Devils on 18 April, the sixth round between Wigan Warriors and Hull Kingston Rovers on 15 May and the quarter final matches between Hull Kingston Rovers and Catalans Dragons on 25 June and Hull F.C. versus Leeds Rhinos on 26 June.

Notes

External links
 Challenge Cup official website

References

Challenge Cup
Challenge Cup
Challenge Cup
Challenge Cup
Challenge Cup
Challenge Cup